Thrills and Chills is a 1938 Fleischer Studios animated short film starring Betty Boop.

Premise
Betty Boop and Pudgy take the train to a ski resort and find themselves being swept away over a waterfall. They get rescued by an amorous moron.

References

External links
 Thrills and Chills on Youtube.
 Thrills and Chills at the Big Cartoon Database.
 

1938 films
Betty Boop cartoons
1930s American animated films
1938 animated films
Paramount Pictures short films
Fleischer Studios short films
Short films directed by Dave Fleischer
American black-and-white films